Juybar (also Romanized as Jūybār; also known as Bāghlū) is a city and capital of Juybar County, Mazandaran Province, Iran. In the 2006 census, its population was 27,117, with 7,052 families. This city is known as the wrestling capital of Iran.

Tourist Attractions 
 Jom'e Bazaar Bridge
 Sikan Bridge
 Juybar Bazaar
 Chapakrud
 Bizaki Saqanefar
 Adham Ancient Site
 Azaan Bridge
 Kord Kola Lagoon

Notable people 
 Hassan Yazdani
 Reza Yazdani
 Masoud Esmaeilpour
 Komeil Ghasemi
 Sobhan Rouhi
 Ezzatollah Akbari
 Mehdi Hajizadeh
 Ayat Vagozari
 Kamran Ghasempour
 Yasubedin Rastegar Jooybari
 Mohammad Nokhodi
 Amir Mohammad Yazdani
 Shahab Gordan
 Mahmoud Fekri
 Soroush Ahmadi
 Ali Nazari Juybari

References

Populated places in Juybar County
Cities in Mazandaran Province